Gail McCann Beatty (born October 29, 1965) is an American politician who served in the Missouri House of Representatives from 2011 to 2018.

Director of Assessment for the Jackson County, Missouri

References

1965 births
Living people
Democratic Party members of the Missouri House of Representatives
Women state legislators in Missouri
21st-century American politicians
21st-century American women politicians